Back to Basics is a 1994 live album recording by Alan Hull. Backed by Kenny Craddock, the album was recorded live at the Mean Fiddler and Blackheath Halls in London in January 1994.

Track listing 
All tracks composed by Alan Hull; except where noted.
 "United States of Mind"
 "Poor Old Ireland"
 "All Fall Down"
 "Lady Eleanor"
 "Winter Song"
 "Walk in the Sea"
 "Mother Russia" (Kenny Craddock)
 "This Heart of Mine" (Kevin Phillipson)
 "Mr. Inbetween"
 "January Song"
 "Breakfast"
 "Day of the Jackal"
 "O No Not Again"
 "Run for Home"
 "Fog on the Tyne"

Personnel
Alan Hull - guitar, vocals
Kenny Craddock - guitar, keyboards, accordion, backing vocals

References

  

Alan Hull albums
1994 live albums